Starman (Will Payton) is a DC Comics superhero who was created by Roger Stern and Tom Lyle, and one of several characters to have the Starmen name.

Publication history
Derived by Roger Stern and Tom Lyle in Starman #1 (October 1988).

Scott Snyder decided to revive him in his Justice League run as he felt that he is an under-explored character.

Fictional character biography

Post-Crisis
Payton gained his powers of flight, super strength, a mild amount of shapeshifting, and the ability to alter his appearance and fire bolts of energy from his hands after being struck by a bolt of energy from a satellite in space. He was in his early twenties and worked as a magazine copy editor. The satellite had been launched by the Hutchison Institute, and the powers had been intended for their team of super-agents the Power Elite. Despite his short career, he gained a good reputation among other heroes, even assisting Superman on some occasions, such as helping him recharge after an encounter with Parasite drained most of his solar energy, and posing as Superman when he was briefly depowered by Lex Luthor's use of Mister Mxyzptlk's Red Kryptonite (although he was forced to leave to recover after he was injured in a confrontation with evil genius Thaddeus Killgrave). He first appeared in Starman (vol. 1) #1 (October 1988). Starman seemingly died fighting the supervillain Eclipso.

The 1990s Starman series revealed that his fate was different from that previously believed. The mysterious bolt of energy that infused Payton with his cosmic abilities was revealed to be the essence of the alien Prince named Gavyn, who also used the name Starman. It is currently unclear whether the two men, Gavyn and Payton, fused into one being with shared memories, or if Payton was killed by the bolt that struck him and was replaced by Gavyn's essence.

Rebirth
During DC Rebirth, Will Payton became revived during the build up of Dark Nights: Metal. In 1988, the Stellaron-5 satellite attempted to capture a fragment of the power of the Totality decades before it would arrive in full, but it proved to be too limited for the task. The satellite's systems backfired one by one, firing a beam of light towards Earth that hit Will Payton, walking in the Rockies, infusing him with a strange energy that gave him superpowers.

Payton became a grassroots superhero, but found himself pursued by the scientists who operated the Stellaron-5, seeking the secrets of the Totality contained in his physiology. During his adventures, he assisted Carter Hall in his search for answers about the origins of Nth Metal.

A present-day Lex Luthor, pursuing his own search for the Totality's secrets, traveled back in time and captured Payton, torturing and experimenting on him, and gaining crucial information from him which Luthor then wiped from his mind. Somehow, Payton eventually managed to escape, finding his way to that era's Justice League.

References

External links
 Starman (1988) at Don Markstein's Toonopedia.

DC Comics male superheroes
Comics characters introduced in 1988
Characters created by Roger Stern
Characters created by Tom Lyle
DC Comics metahumans
DC Comics characters who can teleport 
DC Comics characters with superhuman strength
DC Comics characters who are shapeshifters
Fictional characters with energy-manipulation abilities
Starman (DC Comics)